= André Luís Brandão =

Angolan politician

André Luís Brandão was the Angolan minister for transport from 1992 to 2008.
